The brown guitarfish (Rhinobatos schlegelii) is a species of fish in the Rhinobatidae family. It is found in western Pacific of Taiwan and the Philippines. Its natural habitats are open seas, shallow seas, coral reefs, and estuarine waters. The Taiwan guitarfish (Rhinobatos formosensis) was formerly considered a distinct species, but is now considered a junior synonym.

References

Rhinobatos
Fish of Taiwan
Fish described in 1926
Taxonomy articles created by Polbot